Mágico: Carta de Amor (Portuguese for "Magician: Love Letter") is a live album by saxophonist Jan Garbarek, guitarist Egberto Gismonti and bassist Charlie Haden recorded in 1981 and released on the ECM label in 2012. The album follows the trio's first two recordings Magico (1979) and Folk Songs (1981).

Reception

All About Jazz correspondent John Kelman commented, "Carta de Amor is a reminder of how a particular point in time, when the pan-cultural and cross-genre interests of three artists from vastly different backgrounds and musical upbringings, could come together in rare synchronicity".

The AllMusic review by Thom Jurek awarded the album 4 stars, stating, "Mágico: Carta de Amor is a musical treasure trove that features three players from three continents working in near-symbiotic dialogue, offering music that showcases compositional and improvisational mastery, yet transcends the limitations of genre classification".

The Guardians John Fordham noted, "It's an impassioned and fiercely improvisational collection of variations on powerful themes by all three, touching on Haden's Liberation Music Orchestra repertoire and Garbarek's free-jazz history".

Track listing
All compositions by Egberto Gismonti except as indicated Disc One: "Carta de Amor" – 7:25   
 "La Pasionaria" (Charlie Haden) – 16:26   
 "Cego Aderaldo" – 9:50   
 "Folk Song" (Traditional) – 8:09   
 "Don Quixote" – 8:25   
 "Spor" (Jan Garbarek) – 14:01 Disc Two:' 
 "Branquinho" – 7:37   
 "All That Is Beautiful" (Haden) – 15:35   
 "Palhaço" – 9:12   
 "Two Folk Songs" (Traditional) – 3:39   
 "Carta de Amor, Var." – 7:35

Personnel
 Jan Garbarek – soprano saxophone, tenor saxophone
 Egberto Gismonti – guitar, piano
 Charlie Haden – bass

References

External links 
 Jan Garbarek / Egberto Gismonti / Charlie Haden – Mágico: Carta de Amor (rec. 1981, rel. 2012) album review by Thom Jurek, credits & releases at AllMusic
 Jan Garbarek / Egberto Gismonti / Charlie Haden – Mágico: Carta de Amor (rec. 1981, rel. 2012) album releases & credits at Discogs
 Jan Garbarek / Egberto Gismonti / Charlie Haden – Mágico: Carta de Amor (rec. 1981, rel. 2012) album to be listened as stream on Spotify

ECM Records live albums
Charlie Haden live albums
Jan Garbarek live albums
Egberto Gismonti albums
2012 live albums
Albums produced by Manfred Eicher